Pseudidonauton vexa is a species of moth of the family Limacodidae. It is found in northern and central Vietnam and south-eastern Thailand at altitudes between 280 and 380 meters.

The length of the forewings is 6–7 mm for males and about 9 mm for females. Adults have a pale brown ground colour. The forewings have a basal dark area defined by a whitish distal border. Adults have been recorded in early August and from late September to early October.

Etymology
The species name is derived from Latin vexo (meaning "disarrange").

References

External links 
 The Barcode of Life Data Systems (BOLD)

Limacodidae
Moths described in 2009
Moths of Asia